Sajan K Mathew (born 12 March 1981) is an Indian film director who works in Malayalam films. He began his film career as an ad-film maker; later worked in some movies as Assistant director. Sajan Mathew made his directorial debut Oru Murai Vanthu Parthaya in 2016.

Career
Sajan Alummoottil started his career in films with director Deepu Karunakaran. He assisted Vasudev Sanal in God’s own Country (2014) and Dileesh Nair in Tamaar Padaar (2014).
Oru Murai Vanthu Parthaya(2016) was his directoral debut.

Filmography

References

External links
Sajan K Mathew- facebook profile
S K Mathew on twitter

1981 births
Living people
People from Kollam district
Malayalam film directors
Film directors from Kerala